The 2004–05 season of the Eerste Divisie began in August 2004 and ended in April 2005. The title was won by Heracles Almelo.

Promoted teams
The following teams were promoted to the Eredivisie at the end of the season:
Heracles Almelo (champion)
Sparta Rotterdam (promoted through playoffs)

New teams
These teams were relegated from the Eredivisie at the start of the season:
FC Volendam (17th position, relegated through playoffs)
FC Zwolle (18th position)

League standings

Playoff standings

Top scorers

See also
 2004–05 Eredivisie
 2004–05 KNVB Cup
 2004–05 Sparta Rotterdam season

References

JupilerLeague.nl - Official website Eerste Divisie 
Netherlands - List of final tables (RSSSF)

Eerste Divisie seasons
2004–05 in Dutch football
Neth